Ives House may refer to:

Charles Ives House, Danbury, Connecticut, listed on the NRHP in Fairfield County, Connecticut
Ives-Baldwin House, Meriden, Connecticut, listed on the NRHP in New Haven County, Connecticut
Gideon Ives House New Boston, Illinois, listed on the NRHP in Mercer County, Illinois
Dr. John Ives House, Jamesville, New York, listed on the NRHP in Onondaga County, New Yorke 
Thomas P. Ives House, Providence, Rhode Island, a National Historic Landmark